Plastin-3 is a highly conserved protein that in humans is encoded by the PLS3 gene on the X chromosome.

Function 

Plastins are a family of actin-binding proteins that are conserved throughout eukaryote evolution and expressed in most tissues of higher eukaryotes. In humans, two ubiquitous plastin isoforms (L and T) have been identified. Plastin 1 (otherwise known as Fimbrin) is a third distinct plastin isoform which is specifically  expressed at high levels in the small intestine. The L isoform is expressed only in hemopoietic cell lineages, while the T isoform has been found in all other normal cells of solid tissues that have replicative potential (fibroblasts, endothelial cells, epithelial cells, melanocytes, etc.). The C-terminal 570 amino acids of the T-plastin and L-plastin proteins are 83% identical. It contains a potential calcium-binding site near the N-terminus.

Clinical significance 

Defects in PLS3 are associated with osteoporosis and bone fracture in humans and in knockout zebrafish.

References

Further reading

EF-hand-containing proteins